Events in the year 2020 in Namibia.

Incumbents 

 President: Hage Geingob
 Vice President: Nangolo Mbumba
 Prime Minister: Saara Kuugongelwa-Amadhila
 Deputy Prime Minister: Netumbo Nandi-Ndaitwah
 Chief Justice: Peter Shivute

Events 

 14 March – The first reported cases of COVID-19 are announced by the Minister of Health and Social Services, Dr. Kalumbi Shangula. The first cases, a Romanian couple, arrived in Windhoek from Spain via Doha, Qatar, on 11 March.
 17 March – President Hage Geingob declared a state of emergency which introduced measures such as the closure of all borders, suspension of gatherings and economic related resolutions.
 28 March – The country went into lockdown in order to prevent the spread of COVID-19.
26 July – Twaloloka fire in Walvis Bay.
ShutItAllDown - The Gender Based Violence Protests in October 2020

See also

COVID-19 pandemic in Namibia
COVID-19 pandemic in Africa
2020 in Southern Africa
2020 in Angola
2020 in South Africa
2020 in Zambia
2020 in Zimbabwe

References 

 
2020s in Namibia
Years of the 21st century in Namibia
Namibia
Namibia